Geruliai is a village located in the Telšiai District Municipality, 10 kilometers from Telšiai, Lithuania. According to the census of 2001, the village has a population of 95.

History 
During World War II, in summer 1941, 1,500 to 2,000 Jews from local shtetls were murdered in mass executions perpetrated by an Einsatzgruppen of Lithuanian policemen.

References 

Villages in Telšiai County
Telšiai District Municipality
Holocaust locations in Lithuania